Waimes is a municipality of Wallonia located in the province of Liège, Belgium. 

On January 1, 2006, Waimes had a total population of 6,728. The total area is 96.93 km2 which gives a population density of 69 inhabitants per km2.

Waimes is one of two mostly French-speaking municipalities in the East Cantons, the other being Malmedy. German as a minority language is also still widely spoken in Waimes to this day. The other surrounding municipalities in the area are part of the main German-speaking Community of Belgium.

The municipality consists of the following districts: Faymonville, Robertville (including the village of Ovifat), and Waimes.

See also
 List of protected heritage sites in Waimes
 Reinhardstein Castle

References

External links 
 
 Castle Reinhardstein

 
Municipalities of Liège Province